José Rua (8 December 1911 – 5 July 2002) was a Puerto Rican sports shooter. He competed in the 25 m pistol event at the 1952 Summer Olympics. Rua also won a gold medal at the 1954 Central American and Caribbean Games.

References

External links
 

1911 births
2002 deaths
People from San Germán, Puerto Rico
Puerto Rican male sport shooters
Olympic shooters of Puerto Rico
Shooters at the 1952 Summer Olympics
Place of birth missing